The 1954 Bordeaux Grand Prix was a non-championship Formula One motor race held on 9 May 1954 on a street circuit centred around the Place des Quinconces in Bordeaux, Gironde, France. The Grand Prix was won by José Froilán González, driving with Ferrari. Gonzalez also set fastest lap. Ferrari drivers Robert Manzon and Maurice Trintignant finished second and third, with Trintignant starting from pole.

Classification

Race

References

Bordeaux
Bordeaux Grand Prix
Bordeaux Grand Prix